Roger de Aswardby  MA (fl. 1353–1362) was a late 14th-century Master of University College, Oxford, England.

De Aswardby was a Fellow of University College, Oxford, and later became Master (head) of the College. He became a proctor of Oxford University in 1350 with Robert Frommund of Exeter College.

See also
 Aswardby, Lincolnshire

References

Year of birth unknown
Year of death unknown
14th-century English people
14th-century scholars
Fellows of University College, Oxford
Masters of University College, Oxford